Toora-Khem (Doora-Xem) is a rural locality (a selo) and the administrative center of Todzhinsky District of Tuva, Russia. Population:

Climate
Due to high elevation, Toora-Khem has a subarctic climate (Köppen climate classification Dwc) with bitterly cold, long winters and mild, damp summers.

References

Notes

Sources

Rural localities in Tuva